Risen is a 2010 Welsh sports drama film directed by Neil Jones and starring Stuart Brennan, Shane Richie, John Noble and Erik Morales. It is a biopic of the Welsh boxer Howard Winstone.

References

External links
 

2010 films
2010s sports drama films
British boxing films
British sports drama films
Biographical films about sportspeople
Films set in Wales
Films set in the 1960s
2010 drama films
2010s English-language films
Films directed by Neil Jones
2010s British films
English-language drama films